A schism is a division between people, usually belonging to an organization, movement, or religious denomination. 

Schism  may also refer to:

Religious 
List of schisms in Christianity
Meletian schism (4th century), a split involving the Patriarch of Antioch
 Nestorian Schism (431), a split between the Church in the Sassanid Empire and the Church in the Eastern Roman Empire, after the First Council of Ephesus
 Non-Chalcedonian Christianity (5th century), a split between the church in Armenia, Syria and Egypt and the church in Asia Minor, the Balkan peninsula and Italy
 Acacian schism (484–519), a split between the Eastern and Western Christian churches 
 Schism of the Three Chapters (553–698), a split within the Roman Catholic Church
 Photian schism (863–867), a split between Eastern and Western Christianity
 East–West Schism, (11th century; 1054), a split between the Roman Catholic Church and the Eastern Orthodox Church; sometimes called The Great Schism
 Western Schism (1378–1417), a split within the Roman Catholic Church
 Schism of 1552 (1552), a split within the Church of the East
 Protestant Reformation (16th century; starting 1517), a split between the Catholic Church and early Protestants
 Anglican Schism or English Reformation (16th century), a split between the Catholic Church and England
 Great Russian Schism (mid-17th century), a split between the Russian Orthodox Church and the Old Believers movement 
 Nonjuring schism (1688), a split within the Anglican Churches of England, Scotland and Ireland
 Crotty Schism (early 19th century), two priests split from the Catholic Church in Ireland
 Bulgarian schism (1872), a split between the Orthodox Church and the Bulgarian Church
 Aglipayan schism, a group of Filipino nationalists split during the early 20th century
 Montaner Schism (1967–1969), a Catholic parish split from its diocese in northern Italy who eventually joined the Eastern Orthodox Church
1996 Moscow–Constantinople schism , the break of communion between the patriarchates of Moscow and Constantinople over the dispute concerning the canonical jurisdiction over Estonia.
2018 Moscow–Constantinople schism, the break of communion between the patriarchates of Moscow and Constantinople over the dispute concerning the canonical jurisdiction over Ukraine.
Muslim schism
 Ahmadiyya schism (1914), a split of the Lahore Ahmadiyya Movement. Commonly known among the Ahmadis as just "The Split". 
 Jewish schisms, splits along cultural as well as religious bases
 Baháʼí–Azali split (1866), a split between the Bábís and the Bahá'ís

Political
 National Schism (1910–1922), a political crisis in Greece
 Internationalist–defencist schism (1914), a split within European Socialist parties
 Muslim League schisms, splits within the Muslim League of Indian and Pakistan

Sports 
 The Schism (1895), a split between rugby league and rugby union in England
Australian rules football schism (1938–1949), a split between the Victorian Football League and the Victorian Football Association in Australia

Art and entertainment 
 "Schisms" (Star Trek: The Next Generation), 1992 television episode
 Schism (novel), 2004 work by Catherine Asaro
 "Schism" (song), a 2001 song by American rock band Tool
 "Schism", a 1988 song by Anthrax, from State of Euphoria.
 "Schism", a 1994 song from Kerbdog's eponymous debut album.
 Schism Records, a hardcore record label and fanzine operated out of New York in the 1980s
 Schizm: Mysterious Journey, a computer game
 Schisma, a musical term defining a ratio
 "Schism", an enemy in the 2008 survival horror video game Silent Hill: Homecoming
 "X-Men: Schism", a 2011 X-Men storyline
 Schism, the original title for the 2013 film Fractured, by Adam Gierasch and Jace Anderson
 "Schism" (Arrow), an episode of Arrow
 Schism, a professional wrestling stable consisting of Joe Gacy, Rip Fowler and Jagger Reid

See also
 Schismatic (disambiguation)